The tule shrew (Sorex ornatus juncensis) is a possibly extinct subspecies of the ornate shrew (Sorex ornatus). It was confined to the Baja California peninsula in Mexico.

Description
The holotype, a young adult female, has a total length of 101 mm, a tail length of 41 mm and a hindfood length of 12.5 mm. The condylobasal length of the skull is 16.2 mm, the basal length is 13.9 mm, the breadth of the braincase is 7.5 mm, the palatal length is 7.2 mm, and the interorbital breadth is 3.5 mm. In comparism to the ornate shrew the braincase is higher, narrower and less flattened. The tail is slightly longer and the feet are more dusky. The upperparts and sides are grey or slightly darker. The upperparts are smokey grey with a mixed hazel and vinaceous-buff wash. The tail is indistinct bicolored, with mixed grey and wood-brown upperparts and pale ochre-buff underparts.

Distribution

Status
The tule shrew is only known by four specimens collected by Edward William Nelson and Edward Alphonso Goldman in September 1905. Attempts by Laurence Markham Huey in the 1940s and by Jesús E. Maldonado in 1991 to rediscover this shrew failed. Maldonado further noted that the El Socorro salt marsh area is essentially dry due to housing construction and that the tule shrew is likely extinct.

References

Mammals of Mexico
Sorex
Extinct mammals of North America
Taxa named by Edward Alphonso Goldman